is a district located in Okayama Prefecture, Japan.

Towns and villages
 Mabi

Merger
 On August 1, 2005 - the town of Mabi, along with the town of Funao (from Asakuchi District), was merged into the expanded city of Kurashiki. Kibi District was dissolved as a result of this merger.

Former districts of Okayama Prefecture